Otahi (French: Seule - English: Alone) is a 1893 oil on canvas painting by the Post-Impressionist artist Paul Gauguin.

Painted in Tahiti, the pose the subject takes is considered one to have been taboo as it  one where  the woman makes herself ready for sexual penetration.  The woman wears a pareo around her loin. 

The work was part of a lawsuit between Russian billionaire Dmitry Rybolovlev, Swiss art dealer Yves Bouvier, and the auction house Sotheby's, with the former accusing the two latter parties of inflating prices.  Otahi, which was purchased by Rybolovlev for a reputed sum of $120 million US, only resold for some odd $50 million US, resulting in a considerable loss.

See also
 List of most expensive paintings

References

1893 paintings
Paintings by Paul Gauguin